The list of people from Tyne and Wear, in North East England, is divided by metropolitan borough:

 
Tyne and Wear
People